Jan Gualtherus van Breda Kolff (18 January 1894 in Medan, Dutch East Indies – 6 February 1976 in West Chatham, Massachusetts, United States) was a Dutch amateur football player.

International career
Van Breda Kolff made his debut in the Netherlands national football team as a player of HVV Den Haag on 2 April 1911 at the age of 17, and (as of 2014) he still holds the record as the youngest player to have ever played for "Oranje". During his debut in a 3–1 win over Belgium he scored the second goal to give the Dutch a 2–0 lead. This also by default made him the youngest goalscorer in the team's history. In total he played 11 international matches, including four games at the 1912 Summer Olympics where he won the bronze medal in a 9–0 win over Finland. The goal he scored in his international debut was the only goal he scored in his 11 caps.

Personal life
Van Breda Kolff later had a career as a stockbroker in the United States.  His son Butch van Breda Kolff and grandson Jan van Breda Kolff are notable American basketball coaches.

International statistics

References

External links

Kolff Family Association

1894 births
1976 deaths
Sportspeople from Medan
Association football forwards
Dutch footballers
Netherlands international footballers
Olympic footballers of the Netherlands
Olympic bronze medalists for the Netherlands
Olympic medalists in football
Footballers at the 1912 Summer Olympics
Medalists at the 1912 Summer Olympics
Dutch people of the Dutch East Indies
Dutch emigrants to the United States